Dairy was formerly an important part of the agricultural production of the state of New Jersey. As of 2018, the state has 50 dairies, down from 200 around the year 2000, and a total of 5,500 cows. New Jersey ranks 44th of the 50 states in milk production.

History
In the middle of the 20th century, New Jersey had over 500 dairy farms, with many delivering milk directly to residents homes.

Due to both governmental and industry changes since that time, many small New Jersey dairy farms have disappeared. Many were lost to the waves of suburban development and others simply could not compete with the larger, more industrial operations of the Midwest. Dairies in the state no longer sold directly to the residents of their particular region, but sold their milk to processing plants which would then handle milk distribution. This led to a fall in prices, which led to the merger or closure of many state dairy farms.

Recently, due to the growth of the organic movement and interest in local food, dairy farming has taken on a new role in the state, with local, organic milk operations seeing great interest by those interested in where their food comes from.

References 

Milk
Economy of New Jersey
Agriculture in New Jersey
Dairy farming in the United States